Walter Roland Dickerson (April 16, 1928 – May 15, 2008) was an American jazz  vibraphone player, most associated with the post-bop idiom.

Biography
Born in Philadelphia, Pennsylvania, United States, Walt Dickerson graduated from Morgan State University in 1953 and after two years in the Army he settled in California. There he started to gain attention by leading a group with Andrew Hill and Andrew Cyrille, but it was Dickerson's later period in New York City when he gained some further notice. For the Prestige label he recorded four albums. In 1962 Down Beat named him the best new artist.

From 1965 to 1975, he took a break from jazz, but later he worked again with Andrew Hill and Sun Ra. After 1975 Dickerson recorded several albums for the Danish Steeplechase label.

He died in May 2008 from a cardiac arrest.

Discography

As leader

Sources:

As arranger
With Elmo Hope
Sounds from Rikers Island (1963)

References

1931 births
2008 deaths
American jazz vibraphonists
Morgan State University alumni
Musicians from Philadelphia
Prestige Records artists
SteepleChase Records artists
20th-century American musicians
Jazz musicians from Pennsylvania
Black Saint/Soul Note artists
Jazz vibraphonists